Crisman is an unincorporated community and a census-designated place (CDP) located in and governed by Boulder County, Colorado, United States. The CDP is a part of the Boulder, CO Metropolitan Statistical Area. The population of the Crisman CDP was 186 at the United States Census 2010. The Boulder post office (Zip Code 80302) serves the area.

History
Crisman was founded in 1874 as a mining camp and named after the adjacent Crisman Mill, an ore-processing mill owned by prospector and early settler Obed Crisman. Crisman became a boomtown in 1881, when the Yellow Pine Mine produced a massive silver strike. Crisman became a stop on the Greeley, Salt Lake and Pacific Railway. The Panic of 1893 and the subsequent crash of the silver market severely damaged Crisman's economy, although the nearby mines remained open for the duration. In 1894, Boulder Creek flooded, and much of the town was destroyed, including a section of railroad track. The obliterated structures were never rebuilt, and Crisman was significantly reduced in size. In 1901, the Logan Mine, a large gold operation near Crisman, uncovered a second strike, which prevented the town from disappearing altogether. By 1918, Crisman had become increasingly depopulated, and the post office closed that year. In 1919, another catastrophic flood swept through Fourmile Canyon, again destroying a section of railroad track and leaving little left of Crisman. The town has since been reduced to a hamlet.

Geography

Demographics

See also

Outline of Colorado
Index of Colorado-related articles
State of Colorado
Colorado cities and towns
Colorado census designated places
Colorado counties
Boulder County, Colorado
Colorado metropolitan areas
Front Range Urban Corridor
North Central Colorado Urban Area
Denver-Aurora-Boulder, CO Combined Statistical Area
Boulder, CO Metropolitan Statistical Area

References

External links

Crisman @ GhostTowns.com
Boulder County website

Census-designated places in Boulder County, Colorado
Census-designated places in Colorado
Denver metropolitan area
1874 establishments in Colorado Territory